Escape From Terror: The Teresa Stamper Story is a 1995 American crime drama television film based on a true story from Unsolved Mysteries.  It stars Adam Storke, Maria Pitillo, Brad Dourif and Cindy Williams.

Plot

The movie begins with an introduction from Teresa Stamper, giving an interview about her ex-husband Paul Stamper, and how he caught her when she wasn't looking with her thinking that he was a charmer.

The story then flashes back to when 23-year-old Teresa Walden was living with her mother, Wanda, in Hennessey, Oklahoma in November 1982. She applies for a job as a secretary for Stamper Oil Company, owned and operated by Paul Stamper. She gets the job and becomes attracted to Paul, her boss, and they eventually begin dating. One day, Paul brings Teresa some flowers and a wedding ring and proposes to her. They get married in Las Vegas in February 1983; and afterwards, Paul gives Teresa's job away to another lady Mrs. Lawson, angering Teresa.

When Teresa confronts Paul about it, he slaps her across the face, which begins a string of abusive episodes. Later, he shows up at Wanda's house, where Teresa had moved back to, and apologizes to Teresa. It is revealed that Teresa's father abused Wanda when Teresa was a little girl. Meanwhile, Paul takes Teresa to a house he bought, and also gives Teresa a new jacket he bought for her, and they kiss and make up.

After two years of a seemingly happy marriage, Paul and Teresa have a daughter, whom they name Katie. However, unbeknownst to Teresa, Paul had been stealing oil pumps. When Teresa goes to look for Paul at a local bowling alley, he abuses her again by yelling at her and grabbing her violently believing that she is seeing someone behind his back. The next day, Charlie, one of Paul's employees, informs Teresa about Paul's theft and that Paul had also been abusing drugs; but Teresa doesn't believe it.

Later that night, Teresa takes Paul to a bar, believing that he is just tired from working. While at the bar, Teresa sneaks into the men's bathroom, and catches Paul injecting himself with heroin. He hits her violently and leaves. Teresa is found by an old friend from high school, Chris Butler, who takes her to the hospital. At the hospital, Sheriff Bill Douglass advises Teresa to get a restraining order against Paul, which states that if Paul bothers Teresa again, he will be jailed.

The next day, Teresa hires an attorney and files for divorce. She obtains a restraining order against Paul, and the attorney gives Teresa a tape recorder to record any potentially abusive phone calls from Paul. Later that night, when Paul calls Teresa, threatening to kill her if she divorces him, she records the call. In court, Paul lies and says that he never threatened to kill Teresa and that he loved her, but Teresa's attorney proves him wrong by playing the tape. The judge then grants Teresa a restraining order against Paul and orders him to stay away from her or else he will be arrested.

After the divorce, Teresa begins a relationship with Chris. One night, as they are driving home, they are pulled over by a car that they think is the police, but it is Paul, posing as a police officer and stalking Teresa. Paul shoots Chris and kidnaps Teresa. Paul holds Teresa hostage until the next day, when she manages to escape from him at a diner and she hurries to a nearby establishment, and calls 9-1-1. The police then catch Paul, who attempts to escape on a bus, and arrest him. Teresa is returned home to Wanda and Katie, learning that Chris survived the shooting.

In jail, Paul meets an inmate who will be released in three days. Seeing this as an opportunity for a jailbreak, Paul lies to the inmate, telling him that he is rich and will pay him if he helps him escape. The inmate foolishly believes Paul, and helps him break out of jail. Sheriff Douglass finds out and advises Teresa, Wanda, and Katie to stay at his sister-in-law's house in Norman, Oklahoma, until they recapture Paul. Their escape from Paul is unsuccessful, as he finds them there and leaves Teresa flowers. Sheriff Douglass tries to recapture Paul at the hotel room of the inmate who had helped him escape from prison, but the recapture was also unsuccessful. Chris encourages Teresa to break up with him so she can start a new life, to which she kisses him and accepts.

Five years later, on Katie's fifth birthday at their new house in Nashville Tennessee, Paul calls Teresa and tells her to wish his daughter a happy birthday for him. Teresa tells Paul to leave her and Katie alone. Teresa reports this incident to Sheriff Douglass and he decides to put Paul's picture on the TV show Unsolved Mysteries. People begin to call in about a man supposedly named Gary Wickle, who resembles Paul and who is a truck driver. "Wickle" lives in Commerce City, Colorado and had kidnapped a woman, threatening to kill her if she didn't marry him.

Douglass calls the Commerce City Police and asks them to do surveillance of Gary Wickle's house, where it is revealed that "Gary Wickle" is in fact Paul Stamper. He had married a woman with two children of her own from a previous marriage, and she is pregnant with their first child together. As Paul boards his truck to make a delivery run to Kansas, the police ambush and arrest him. When Sheriff Douglass gets the news, he informs Teresa and she happily embraces her mother.

Back to the present day; Teresa, in her interview, reveals that Paul was sentenced to 35 years in prison and that after the trial he was still saying that he loved Teresa. Teresa also says Paul never knew what love was and that she now knows what it isn't.

Cast
Adam Storke as Paul Stamper-Teresa's abusive husband, the father of Katie from his marriage to Teresa and an unborn child from his 2nd marriage, and the film's main antagonist who stalks his 1st wife throughout the movie.  He owns an oil company.  He later works for a trucking company in Colorado under the alias Gary Wickle.
Maria Pitillo as Teresa Walden Stamper-Paul's wife, mother of Katie, and daughter of Wanda.  She's the film's Main protagonist who must protect her mother and daughter from her abusive husband.
Brad Dourif as Sheriff Bill Douglass-the sheriff who makes sure Teresa is safe and tries to catch Paul.
Cindy Williams as Wanda Walden-mother of Teresa and maternal grandmother of Katie.  She suffered from an abusive marriage to Teresa's dad.
Tony Becker as Chris Butler-A friend of Teresa's who she later starts to date, and gets shot by Paul but survives.
Luce Rains as Charlie-One of Paul's employees at the oil company who senses that Paul is trouble.
Stanley M. Fisher as the judge-a judge who grants Teresa a restraining order from Paul after she divorces him.
Pat Mahoney as Luke Burnham-a kind elderly man who Paul buys his house from for him and Teresa after Luke moves.
Caitlyn Flinn as Jennifer, the little girl on the bus-a little girl who Paul meets on the bus while trying to escape from the police.  Her parents are divorced and she is on the bus to go visit her grandmother on her farm.

References

External links

1995 television films
1995 films
1995 crime drama films
American crime drama films
Films about domestic violence
Crime films based on actual events
American drama television films
1990s English-language films
1990s American films